In the 2007–08 season, Partizani Tirana competed in the Kategoria Superiore for the seventh consecutive season. The club finished in second place, after a dramatic loss in a deciding match against Dinamo Tirana in the last round. Their second place was a best result since 1993.

First-team squad

Source:

Competitions

Kategoria Superiore

League table

Results summary

Results by round

Matches

Albanian Cup

First round

Second round

Quarter-finals

References

External links
Official website 

Partizani
FK Partizani Tirana seasons